Dame Louise Victoria Samuel,  (née Steibel; 5 August 1870 – 13 October 1925), sometimes called Louise Gilbert Samuel, was an English suffragist and charity worker.

The daughter of Isaac Steibel, she married, in 1889, Gilbert Ellis Samuel, son of Edwin Samuel and brother of Sir Stuart Samuel and Herbert Samuel, Viscount Samuel. From its foundation in 1908 until its dissolution in 1918, she served as honorary secretary of the Conservative Women's Franchise Association, a non-militant women's suffrage movement. In 1919, she was elected to Chelsea Borough Council for the Municipal Reform Party. In August 1914, she co-founded the War Refugees' Committee. She was a member of the Managing Committee and head of the Health Section throughout the First World War.

In 1918, she was appointed Officer of the Order of the British Empire (OBE) for her refugee work. She was appointed Dame Commander of the Order of the British Empire (DBE) in the 1920 civilian war honours.

References
Obituaries, The Times, 14 October 1925 and 16 October 1925

1925 deaths
Year of birth unknown
Dames Commander of the Order of the British Empire
English activists
English women activists
English humanitarians
English Jews
English suffragists
Municipal Reform Party politicians
Members of Chelsea Metropolitan Borough Council
People educated at Notting Hill & Ealing High School
Place of birth missing
Place of death missing
British women in World War I
1870 births
Women councillors in England